The Men's Skeet event at the 2018 Commonwealth Games was held on 8–9 April at the Belmont Shooting Centre, Brisbane. The winner was Cyprus' Georgios Achellios.

Results

Qualification

Final

References

Mens skeet